The 1993 Cleveland Indians season was the 93rd season for the franchise.

Offseason
October 15, 1992: Scott Bailes was released by the California Angels.
 November 12, 1992: Eric Plunk was signed as a free agent by the Indians.
 December 7, 1992: Dave Otto was drafted from the Indians by the Pittsburgh Pirates in the 1992 minor league draft.
 December 7, 1992: Willie Cañate was drafted from the Indians by the Cincinnati Reds in the 1992 rule 5 draft.
 December 8, 1992: Bob Ojeda signed as a free agent by the Indians.
 December 14, 1992: Mike Bielecki was signed as a free agent by the Indians.
 March 4, 1993: Sam Horn was signed as a free agent by the Indians.

Spring training
The Indians were in Winter Haven for spring training on March 22, 1993, when Ojeda went on a boat ride with new teammates Steve Olin and Tim Crews.  Crews was legally drunk and it was nearly dark when the boat struck a pier, killing Crews and Olin.  It was the first death of active major league players since Thurman Munson in 1979.  Ojeda suffered major head lacerations and sat out most of the season to recuperate – both physically and mentally. He attributed his slouch (in his seat) for saving his life.  He returned late that season and had a respectable 4.40 ERA in 43 innings.  In response to the accident that took Olin and Crews in 1993, the Indians wore a patch on their sleeves of their jerseys. It consisted of a baseball with their numbers on it. Olin's #31 is on the left, with an arrow above. Crews' #52 is on the right, with a star above it.

Regular season

Season standings

Record vs. opponents

Notable transactions
 March 24, 1993: Mike Aldrete was released by the Indians.
 March 31, 1993: Mark Whiten was traded by the Indians to the St. Louis Cardinals for Mark Clark and Juan Andújar (minors).
 June 1, 1993: José Hernández was traded by the Indians to the Chicago Cubs for Heathcliff Slocumb.
 June 1, 1993: Fernando Hernández and Tracy Sanders (minors) were traded by the Indians to the San Diego Padres for Jeremy Hernández.
 June 19, 1993: Mike Bielecki was released by the Indians.
 August 17, 1993: Thomas Howard was traded by the Indians to the Cincinnati Reds for Randy Milligan.
 August 19, 1993: Glenallen Hill was traded by the Indians to the Chicago Cubs for Candy Maldonado.

Opening Day Lineup

Roster

Player stats

Batting

Starters by position 
Note: Pos = Position; G = Games played; AB = At bats; H = Hits; Avg. = Batting average; HR = Home runs; RBI = Runs batted in

Other batters
Note: G = Games played; AB = At bats; H = Hits; Avg. = Batting average; HR = Home runs; RBI = Runs batted in

Pitching

Starting pitchers 
Note: GS = Games started; IP = Innings pitched; W = Wins; L = Losses; ERA = Earned run average; SO = Strikeouts;

Other pitchers 
Note: G = Games pitched; IP = Innings pitched; W = Wins; L = Losses; ERA = Earned run average; SO = Strikeouts

Relief pitchers 
Note: G = Games pitched; W = Wins ; L = Losses ; SV = Saves ; ERA = Earned run average; SO = Strikeouts

Awards and honors

All-Star Game

Minor league affiliates

References

1993 Cleveland Indians at Baseball Reference
1993 Cleveland Indians at Baseball Almanac

Cleveland Guardians seasons
Cleveland Indians season
Cleve